Ramon B. Neri was a Filipino politician who was the Mayor of Cagayan de Misamis from 1912–1916 and represented Misamis during the 4th Philippine Legislature. Together with his brother, Misamis Oriental Governor Vicente Neri, they Founded the first weekly newspaper in Cagayan de Oro. It was called Ang Katarungan.

References

Mayors of Cagayan de Oro
Year of birth missing
Year of death missing
Members of the House of Representatives of the Philippines from Misamis Occidental
Members of the House of Representatives of the Philippines from Misamis Oriental
Members of the Philippine Legislature